Vasak I Mamikonian (died ) was an Armenian military officer from the Mamikonian family, who occupied the hereditary office of sparapet (generalissimo) of the Kingdom of Armenia under the Arsacid king Arshak II (reigned c. 350–367/8).

References

Vasak
Sparapets
People executed by the Sasanian Empire
4th-century Armenian people
360s deaths